Xavi Moreno Layme (born 13 August 2003) is a Peruvian footballer who plays as a midfielder for Sport Boys.

Career statistics

Club

Notes

References

2003 births
Living people
People from Arequipa
Peruvian footballers
Association football midfielders
FBC Melgar footballers
Sport Boys footballers
Peruvian Primera División players